Upton-on-Severn railway station  was a railway station serving  Upton-on-Severn in the English county of Worcestershire.

History
It  was opened by the Midland Railway's Tewkesbury and Malvern Railway between Great Malvern and Ashchurch.

At grouping in 1923 it became part of the London Midland and Scottish Railway, with British Railways taking over upon nationalisation of the railway system in January 1948.  The British Transport Commission withdrew the service to Great Malvern on 1 December 1952, with the station henceforth becoming a terminus.  It then closed to passengers on 14 August 1961, with the withdrawal of the remaining trains from Ashchurch.  Freight traffic continued until July 1963, when the Upton to Tewkesbury section was closed completely.

The station was subsequently demolished and no trace now remains.

Stationmasters

H. Rich ca. 1864 ca. 1866
Samuel Hawkins Orchard until 1872 (afterwards station master at Stapleford and Sandiacre)
Henry Lewis 1872 - 1877
A. Withers 1877 - 1878
F.H. Parsons 1878 - 1881 
W.H. Adcock 1881 - 1883
R. Nash 1883 - 1905
William Garner Johnson 1906 - ca. 1929
Edward Harry Taylor ca. 1948

References

Further reading

 

Disused railway stations in Worcestershire
Railway stations in Great Britain opened in 1864
Railway stations in Great Britain closed in 1961
Former Midland Railway stations
1864 establishments in England
1961 disestablishments in England
Upton-upon-Severn